The Queen's Green Canopy (QGC) is an initiative that began in May 2021 in the United Kingdom in honour of the Platinum Jubilee of Queen Elizabeth II in 2022. To increase and protect the native tree cover, people are being urged to create this 'special gift' for the Queen, to mark her 70 years on the throne.

Background 
This initiative is being led by Cool Earth in partnership with the UK Government and the Woodland Trust. Communities, charities, schools, scout groups, councils and landowners are invited to create a network of individual or specimen trees, tree avenues, copses and woodlands. 

The campaign encourages the planting of healthy native trees that will thrive, enhancing our environment and the landscape for generations to come. To help the environment and make local areas greener, people are being urged to plant trees across the United Kingdom to create a lasting legacy in honour of the Queen's leadership. 

Alongside this, 70 Ancient Trees and 70 Ancient Woodlands, including some trees more than 1,000 years old and many with links to historical events, have been designated as part of the Canopy.

In a statement, Prime Minister Boris Johnson said:

The Woodland Trust is supplying 3 million saplings free to school and community groups, and a pilot scheme to train unemployed young people to plant and manage trees will also be created under the auspices of the London environmental college Capel Manor College. The initiative is expected to include both individuals planting trees in their gardens and the creation of avenues and copses. Seventy ancient woodlands and 70 ancient trees will also be identified as part of the celebration.

Launch and the Planting season 
The Queen's Green Canopy was officially launched in May 2021, in advance of the Jubilee year of 2022.

The Queen and Prince Charles planted the first tree in March at Windsor Castle. Charles called it a 'tree-bilee' in a video message and also emphasised the importance of planting the right species in useful places. The two planted another tree at Balmoral Castle on 1 October 2021 to mark the official beginning of the initiative. On 3 October 2021, the first overseas Jubilee Tree was planted by Princess Anne at Hôtel de Charost, residence of the British Ambassador to France. On 30 November 2021, Prince Richard planted the final tree in Rutland's Duke of Edinburgh Memorial Orchard, which was created as a tribute to Prince Philip and is part of the Queen's Green Canopy initiative.

As of January 2022, about 60,000 trees had been planted to mark the Jubilee.

More than one million trees were planted during the first official planting season from October to March. The Countess of Wessex and Forfar planted an elm tree in the Buckingham Palace garden to mark the end of first planting season. In a message marking the end of the first planting season, the Queen said that she was "deeply touched" by the planting of trees in huge numbers and hoped that the "Jubilee trees flourish and grow for many years to come, for future generations to enjoy". A  sculpture called 'Tree of Trees' was erected outside Buckingham Palace for the June celebrations. The sculpture, which contains 350 native British trees in the form of one giant tree, reflects the more than one million trees planted during Green Canopy initiative. The trees will be gifted to selected community groups for planting after the celebrations.

The first tree planting season ended on 31 March 2021. The second season started in October 2022 and will run until the end of March 2023.

70 Ancient Trees and 70 Ancient Woodlands

70 ancient trees and 70 Ancient Woodlands across the United Kingdom were dedicated to the Queen as part of The Queen's Green Canopy.

See also 
 The Queen's Commonwealth Canopy
 Queen Elizabeth Diamond Jubilee Wood

References

External links
 
 The Queen's Green Canopy at royal.uk
 Trees planted at Army College to honour Captain Tom and launch Green campaign at army.mod.uk

Platinum Jubilee of Elizabeth II
2022 in the United Kingdom
Forest conservation organizations